Adrian Mines (also called Adrian and De Lancey) is an unincorporated community in Jefferson County, in the U.S. state of Pennsylvania.

History
Adrian Mines was founded around 1887 as a mining community. The community was named for its proprietor, Adrian Iselin. The post office at Adrian Mines is called De Lancey. This post office has been in operation since 1888.

References

Unincorporated communities in Jefferson County, Pennsylvania
Unincorporated communities in Pennsylvania